The Church Brew Works is a brewpub in Pittsburgh, Pennsylvania, United States, set in the confines of a restored Roman Catholic church (formerly St. John the Baptist Church).

The brewpub is located at 3525 Liberty Avenue in the Lawrenceville neighborhood of Pittsburgh, Pennsylvania.  The church building was originally built in 1902, and had been used as a church until 1993. Its doors opened as The Church Brew Works on August 1, 1996, after the building underwent extensive renovation, necessitated by years of lying dormant after being officially deconsecrated by the Diocese of Pittsburgh in 1993.

In 2012, Pittsburgh Magazine named it one of the best breweries in Pittsburgh.

Beers
As of September 2007, three flagship brews are locally distributed: Celestial Gold (light lager), Pipe Organ Pale Ale (English pale ale), and Pious Monk Dunkel (Munich-style dark lager).  The in-house selection is rounded out by a rotating Stout, four seasonals or specialties, and one varying cask-conditioned ale.  Also available are Millennium Trippel, a Belgian Tripel (in champagne bottles and 5L minikegs) and Cherry Quadzilla, a Belgian Quadrupel (champagne bottles only).

The Church's beers are brewed on a steam-jacketed 15bbl system built by Specific Mechanical Systems, Ltd. of Victoria, British Columbia.

Awards
In 2012 the Church Brew Works won the Great American Beer Festival's Large Brewpub Brewer of the Year Award.

Local historic landmark status
In 2001, the Church Brew Works was listed on the Pittsburgh History and Landmarks Foundation's List of Historic Landmarks.

Gallery

References

External links

 The Church Brew Works Official Website

Beer brewing companies based in Pittsburgh
Former Roman Catholic church buildings in Pennsylvania
Roman Catholic churches completed in 1902
Companies established in 1996
Churches in Pittsburgh
Lawrenceville (Pittsburgh)